Live at the Regent Theatre – 1 July 1999 is a live album by Australian singer John Farnham. The album was released in Australia on 30 August 1999, and peaked on the ARIA charts at No. 7.

This album features performances from Kate Ceberano, Merril Bainbridge, Nana-Zhami (featuring Farnham's son Robert), James Reyne and Human Nature. This album was recorded on Farnham's 50th birthday, and was a part of the "I Can't Believe He's 50!" celebrations and subsequent tour.

Track listing
 "Reasons" (S. See) – 4:21
 "One" (Harry Nilsson) – 2:54
 "Everything's Alright" (with Kate Ceberano) (Webber, Rice) – 4:17
 "Help!" (with Kate Ceberano)(J. Lennon, P. McCartney) – 5:04
 "A Touch of Paradise" (R. Wilson, G. Smith) – 4:46
 "Age Of Reason"(T. Hunter, J. Pigott) – 4:50
 "Burn For You" (with Merril Bainbridge) (P. Buckle, J. Farnham, R. Faser) – 4:24
 "Raindrops Keep Falling on My Head" (with Merril Bainbridge) (B. Bacharach, H. David) – 4:11
 "Chain Reaction" (D. Stewart, S. Stewart) – 3:53
 "Infatuation" (M. Brady, G. Goble) – 3:17
 "Don't You Know It's Magic" (with James Reyne) (Brian Cadd) – 4:11
 "Comic Conversations" (with James Reyne) (J. Bromley) – 3:26
 "Who's Lovin' You" (with Human Nature) (W. Robinson) – 4:21
 "Everytime You Cry" (with Human Nature) (S. Peiken, G. Sutton) – 4:51
 "That's Freedom" (T. Kimmel, J. Chapman) – 4:35
 "Playing To Win" (G. Goble, J. Farnham, D. Hirschfelder, S. Housden, S. Proffer, W. Nelson, S. Prestwich) – 3:11
 "I Wish" (Stevie Wonder) – 3:56
 "You're the Voice" (M. Ryder, C. Thompson, A. Qunta, K. Reid) – 4:39

Charts

Weekly charts

Year-end charts

Certifications

References 

ARIA Award-winning albums
John Farnham live albums
1999 live albums